Senior School Certificate Examination may refer to:

 All India Senior School Certificate Examination
 West African Senior School Certificate Examination